Elisabetta Rocchetti (born 25 January 1975, in Rome) is an Italian actress and film director.

Biography
Elisabetta Rocchetti, daughter of lawyer Nicola Rocchetti, made her film acting debut in 1996, in Traveling Companion, directed by Peter Del Monte.

In 2003 she won the Golden Globe Award for Best Debut Actress for the film The Embalmer (2002), directed by Matteo Garrone, in which she starred with Valerio Foglia Manzillo.

Among her other film performances are The Card Player and Sleepless, both directed by Dario Argento, Love Is Eternal While It Lasts, directed by Carlo Verdone, and I Love You in All the Languages in the World, directed by Leonardo Pieraccioni. For television she featured in  Il bello delle donne, Do You Like Hitchcock?, Caterina e le sue figlie 2 and Terapia d'urgenza.

In 2006, Rocchetti made her directing debut with the short film L'ultima seduta with Alessandro Manetti, Valentina Tosti and Giampaolo Morelli. In 2010, she wrote, directed and produced her first feature film titled Eighteen: The World at My Feet which starred Marco Rulli, Marco Iannitello and Nina Torresi. In September 2015 she returned to direction with The Veil of Maya, which was filmed in Rome and Grosseto.

Filmography

Acting

Films

Television

Directorial works

References

External links

21st-century Italian actresses
Film directors from Rome
1975 births
Actresses from Rome
Living people